Alvin Otieno (born 19 April 1994) is a Kenyan rugby sevens player who represents Kenya internationally. He made his Olympic debut representing Kenya at the 2020 Summer Olympics.

He was named in the Kenyan squad for the men's rugby sevens tournament at the 2020 Summer Olympics.

Commonly known in the HSBC rugby Sevens series as the Water Buffalo, Otieno dazzles rugby fans with his powerful runs and commanding physique on the pitch.

He is a fast sprinter with quick feet and a flair to his game. He also has a dramatic patch of hair at the back of his head that adds to the allure.

References 

  
1994 births
Living people
Kenya international rugby sevens players
Olympic rugby sevens players of Kenya
Rugby sevens players at the 2020 Summer Olympics
Rugby sevens players at the 2022 Commonwealth Games